Charlottenlund is a suburban area on the coast north of Copenhagen, Denmark. It is the administrative seat of Gentofte Municipality. Bordered to the east by the Øresund, to the South by Hellerup and to the north by Klampenborg, it is one of the wealthiest areas in Denmark. The neighbourhood takes its name after Charlottenlund Palace.

History
 
In 1733, King Christian VI of Denmark rebuilt the Gyldenlund Palace, renaming it Charlottenlund Palace after his sister Princess Charlotte Amalie.

In the 19th century, it became popular with the bourgeoisie in Copenhagen to make excursions to the countryside north of the city. Charlottenlund Forest was a popular destination.

The postal code of Charlottenlund is 2920.

Schools 
Ordrupskole 

Ordrup Gymnasium

Skovshovedskole 

Skovgårdsskolen

Culture and recreation
Local landmarks include Charlottenlund Palace and Gentofte Town Hall.

The Ordrupgaard Museum boasts collections of Danish and French art from the 19th and beginning of the 20th century.

Charlottenlund Fort is located in Charlottenlund Beach Park. It houses a popular camp site. The beach park and the adjacent Charlottenlund Forest forms the largest green space in Gentofte Municipality. Charlottenlund Racetrack is situated just north of Charlottenlund Forest, and has weekly harness races. Most horses and jockeys are from Denmark, but several times every year the track hosts international events, with entries from Europe and North America.

Notable people

Public Service 
 Ernst Heinrich, Baron von Schimmelmann (1747–1831) was a German-Danish politician, businessman and patron of the arts; eponym of Schimmelmannsvej in Charlottenlund
 Thomas Arboe (1837 – 1917 in Charlottenlund) a Danish architect
 Christian X of Denmark (1870 Charlottenlund Palace – 1947) King of Denmark from 1912/1947
 Princess Dagmar of Denmark (1890 in Charlottenlund Palace – 1961) was the youngest child and fourth daughter of Frederick VIII of Denmark
 Tine Susanne Miksch Roed (born 1964) deputy director-general at the Confederation of Danish Industry, lives in Charlottenlund
 Sabine Auken (born 1965) a German bridge player, lives in Charlottenlund
 Peter Fischer-Møller (born 1955 in Charlottenlund) a Danish prelate, Bishop of Roskilde

The Arts 
 Carl Ewald (1856 – 1908 in Charlottenlund) a novelist and satirist known for his fairy tales 
 Johannes Hauerslev (1860 – 1921 in Charlottenlund) a Danish photographer of street scenes and buildings in Copenhagen
 Ruth Berlau (1906 in Charlottenlund – 1974) a Danish actress, director, photographer and writer;  collaborated with Bertolt Brecht
 Axel Strøbye (1928 – 2005 in Charlottenlund) a Danish stage and film actor 
 Anne Marie Helger (born 1946 in Charlottenlund) an actress in theatre, films and TV  
 Bitte Kai Rand (born 1956) a fashion designer for mature women; brought up in Charlottenlund
 Claus Norreen (born 1970 in Charlottenlund) a musician and record producer, in the band Aqua 
 Catharina Svensson (born 1982 in Charlottenlund) a Danish lawyer, a professional equestrienne, model and beauty queen; Miss Earth 2001
 Stephania Potalivo (born 1986 in Charlottenlund) a Danish actress and former child star

Sports 
 Holger Rune (born 2003) a tennis player

See also
 Charlottenlund Palace
 Charlottenlund station
 Privathospitalet Danmark
 :da:Charlottenlund Fort
Charlottenlund Søbad
Charlottenlund_Station
Bernstorff Palace
Jægersborg Allé
 :da:Ordrupvej

References

External links

 www.ordrupgaard.dk

Municipal seats in the Capital Region of Denmark
Municipal seats of Denmark
Gentofte Municipality
Copenhagen metropolitan area
Cities and towns in the Capital Region of Denmark